= Rubik's Brain Racker =

- Package and Puzzle
- Publishers: Winning Moves
- Players: 1
- Setup time: None
- Chance: None
- Skills: Problem-solving
- Synonyms: Delta Ball

Rubik's Brain Racker is a single-player puzzle in the Rubik's line. The puzzle comes with numerous goals to work on and achieve. It was published by Winning Moves Games USA in 2007.

== Gameplay ==
Rubik's Brain Racker is a puzzle that allows for numerous solutions, some given on the back of the packaging. The puzzle is a number of triangles on tracks on a plastic ball. They all have a number (1–5) and a color (red, yellow, blue, and green. To begin playing and solving the puzzle, the user grasps the metal ring on the puzzle and rotates it, allowing the red 1 triangle to pop out of the puzzle and letting the user move the other pieces around. Some examples of goals for the puzzle are to get two colors of triangles into straight lines while having the other two colors in the shape (roughly) in a circle. Another example is to position the triangles into a mosaic in such a way that no elements of the same color are touching. Some variations on these goals require the numbers to be in the correct order, or to not repeat the same number in each of the 12 overlapping, roughly circular panels of five pieces.
